Luke Lamperti (born December 31, 2002) is an American road cyclist who currently rides for UCI Continental team .

On June 18, 2021, at the age of 18, Lamperti avoided several crashes in the final lap to take a surprise victory at the United States National Criterium Championships in Knoxville, Tennessee. In doing so, he became the youngest ever winner of the title.

He competed in the under-23 road race at the 2021 UCI Road World Championships, where he originally finished 10th, but was disqualified afterwards by the UCI jury due to allegedly causing a Belgian rider to crash earlier in the race.

Early life 
Lamperti originally raced motocross before switching to cycling at age 11.

Major results 
2019
 1st  Mountains classification, Tour de l'Abitibi
 1st Stage 2a Grand Prix Rüebliland
 10th Paris–Roubaix Juniors
2021
 1st  National Criterium Championships
 1st Stage 2 Tour d'Eure-et-Loir
2022
 National Road Championships
1st  Criterium
5th Road race
 4th Overall Tour de Taiwan

1st  Points classification
1st Stage 3
 1st Lincoln Grand Prix
 1st Stranraer, Tour Series
 5th Youngster Coast Challenge
 10th Dorpenomloop Rucphen

Personal life

References

External links 
 
 

2002 births
Living people
American male cyclists
Cyclists from California